Technical writing is writing or drafting technical communication used in technical and occupational fields, such as computer hardware and software, architecture, engineering, chemistry, aeronautics, robotics, finance, medical, consumer electronics, biotechnology, and forestry. Technical writing encompasses the largest sub-field in technical communication.

The Society for Technical Communication defines technical communication as any form of communication that exhibits one or more of the following characteristics: "(1) communicating about technical or specialized topics, such as computer applications, medical procedures, or environmental regulations; (2) communicating by using technology, such as web pages, help files, or social media sites; or (3) providing instructions about how to do something, regardless of how technical the task is".

Overview

Technical writing is performed by a technical writer (or technical author) and is the process of writing and sharing technical information in a professional setting. A technical writer's primary task is to communicate technical information to another person or party in the clearest and most effective manner possible. The information that technical writers communicate is often complex, so strong writing and communication skills are essential. Technical writers not only convey information through text, but they must be proficient with computers as well. Technical writers use a wide range of programs to create and edit illustrations, diagramming programs to create visual aids, and document processors to design, create, and format documents.

While technical writing is commonly associated with online help and user manuals, the term technical documentation can cover a wider range of genres and technologies. Press releases, memos, reports, business proposals, datasheets, product descriptions and specifications, white papers, résumés, and job applications are but a few examples of writing that can be considered technical documentation. Some types of technical documentation are not typically handled by technical writers. For example, a press release is usually written by a public relations writer, though a technical writer might have input on any technical information included in the press release.

History

While technical writing has only been recognized as a profession since World War II, its roots can be traced to classical antiquity. Critics cite the works of writers like Aristotle as the earliest forms of technical writing.  Geoffrey Chaucer's work, A Treatise on the Astrolabe, is an early example of a technical document. The earliest examples of technical writing date back to the Old English period.

With the invention of the mechanical printing press, the onset of the Renaissance and the rise of the Age of Reason, documenting findings became a necessity. Inventors and scientists like Isaac Newton and Leonardo da Vinci prepared documents that chronicled their inventions and findings. While never called technical documents during their period of publication, these documents played a crucial role in developing modern forms of technical communication and writing.

The field of technical communication grew during the Industrial Revolution. There was an increasing need to provide people with instructions for using the more and more complex machines that were being invented. However, unlike the past, where skills were handed down through oral traditions, no one besides the inventors knew how to use these new devices. Writing thus became the fastest and most effective way to disseminate information, and writers who could document these devices were desired.

During the 20th century, the need for technical writing skyrocketed, and the profession became officially recognized. The events of World War I and World War II led to advances in medicine, military hardware, computer technology, and aerospace technologies. This rapid growth, coupled with the urgency of war, created an immediate need for well-designed documentation to support the use of these technologies. Technical writing was in high demand during this time, and "technical writer" became an official job title during World War II.

Following World War II, technological advances led to an increase in consumer goods and standards of living. During the post-war boom, public services like libraries and universities, as well as transport systems like buses and highways, saw substantial growth. The need for writers to chronicle these processes increased. It was also during this period that large business and universities started using computers. Notably, in 1949, Joseph D. Chapline authored the first computational technical document, an instruction manual for the BINAC computer.

The invention of the transistor in 1947 allowed computers to be produced more cheaply and within the purchasing range of individuals and small businesses. As the market for these "personal computers" grew, so did the need for writers who could explain and provide user documentation for these devices. The profession of technical writing saw further expansion during the 1970s and 1980s as consumer electronics found their way into the homes of more and more people.

In recent years, the prominence of computers in society has led to many advances in the field of digital communications, leading to changes in the tools technical writers use. Hypertext, word processors, graphics editing programs, and page laying software have made the creation of technical documents faster and easier, and technical writers of today must be proficient in these programs.

Technical documents
Technical writing covers many genres and writing styles, depending on the information and audience. Technical documents are not solely produced by technical writers. Almost anyone who works in a professional setting produces technical documents of some variety. Some examples of technical documentation include:

Instructions and procedures are documents that help either developers or end-users operate or configure a device or program. Examples of instructional documents include user manuals and troubleshooting guides for computer programs, computer hardware, household products, medical equipment, mechanical products, and automobiles.
Proposals. Most projects begin with a proposal—a document that describes the purpose of a project, the tasks that will be performed in the project, the methods used to complete the project, and finally, the cost of the project. Proposals cover a wide range of subjects. For example, a technical writer may author a proposal that outlines how much it will cost to install a new computer system, a marketing professional may write a proposal with the product offerings, and a teacher may write a proposal that outlines how a new biology class will be structured.
Emails, letters, and memoranda are some of the most frequently written documents in a business. Letters and emails can be constructed with a variety of goals—some are usually aimed at simply communicating information while others are designed to persuade the recipient to accomplish a certain task. While letters are usually written to people outside of a company, memoranda (memos) are documents written to other employees within the business.
Press releases. When a company wants to publicly reveal a new product or service, they will have a writer author a press release. This is a document that describes the product's functions and value to the public.
Specifications are design outlines that describe the structure, parts, packaging, and delivery of an object or process in enough detail that another party can reconstruct it. For example, a technical writer might diagram and write the specifications for a smartphone or bicycle so that a manufacturer can produce the object. 
Descriptions are shorter explanations of procedures and processes that help readers understand how something works. For example, a technical writer might author a document that shows the effects of greenhouse gases or demonstrates how the braking system on a bike functions. 
Résumés and job applications are another example of technical documents. They are documents that are used in a professional setting to inform readers of the author's credentials. 
Technical reports are written to provide readers with information, instructions, and analysis for tasks. Reports come in many forms. For example, a technical writer might evaluate a building that is for sale and produce a trip report that highlights his or her findings and whether he or she believes the building should be purchased. Another writer who works for a non-profit company may publish an evaluation report that shows the findings of the company's research into air pollution.
Case study is a published report about a person, group, or situation that has been studied over time; also : a situation in real life that can be looked at or studied to learn about something. For example, an individual's challenging situation at his or her workplace and how he or she resolved it is a case study. 
White papers are documents that are written for experts in a field and typically describe a solution to a technological or business challenge or problem. Examples of white papers include a piece that details how to make a business stand out in the market or a piece explaining how to prevent cyber-attacks on businesses.
Websites. The advent of hypertext has changed the way documents are read, organized, and accessed. Technical writers of today are often responsible for authoring pages on websites like "About Us" pages or product pages. They are often expected to be proficient in web development tools.
Datasheets are the documents that summarize the features, key specifications, technical characteristics, application circuits, and some other important information about the product, machine, equipment, software, application, or system in brief.
API guides are written for the developer community and are used to explain the application programming interfaces.
Help systems are online help centers that provide users with technical information about products and services. They provide content as web pages that are viewed in a browser. The content may be created in help center software, such as Zendesk, or in help authoring tools or component content management systems that can create a help center as an HTML output.

Tools
The following tools are used by technical writers to author and present documents:

Desktop publishing tools or word processors. Technical writers use word processors such as Scrivener, Microsoft Word, Apple Pages, and LibreOffice Writer to author, edit, design, and print documents. Since technical writing is as much about page layout as it is the written language, enhanced desktop publishing tools such as Adobe InDesign and LyX are also used. These programs function similarly to word processors but provide users with more options and features for the document's design and automate much of the formatting.
Help authoring tools. These are used by technical writers to create the help systems that are packaged with software products, delivered through web browsers or provided as files users can view on their computers. When writing instructional procedures to describe mechanical, electrical, or software programs, technical writers use these tools to assist them in simplifying assembly, operation, or installation processes.
Component content management systems. These are also used by technical writers to create help systems and documents. Component Content Management Systems (CCMS) allow writers to create similar outputs as help authoring tools, but they also provide content management features such as version management and built-in workflows.
Image editing software. Often, images and other visual elements can communicate information better than paragraphs of text. In these instances, image editing software like Adobe Photoshop and GIMP are used by technical writers to create and edit the visual aspects of documents like photos, icons and diagrams.
Collaborative software programs. Because technical writing often involves communication between multiple individuals who work for different companies, it can be a collaborative affair.  Technical writers use Wiki Systems and shared document work-spaces to work with other writers and parties to construct technical documents.
Web development tools. Technical writer jobs are no longer limited to just producing documents. They sometimes also produce content for a company's corporate and other professional web sites. Technical writers might therefore be expected to be proficient in Web development tools like Adobe Dreamweaver.
Text editors. Programs such as Microsoft Notepad, TextEdit, or Wordstar allow technical writers to edit plain text. Text editors can be used to change content such as configuration files, documentation files, and programming language source code. Text editors are widely used by technical writers working with online content.
Graphing software. To communicate statistical information such as the number of visits to a restaurant or the amount of money a university spends on its sporting programs, technical writers use graphs and flowcharts. While programs like Microsoft Excel and Word can create basic graphs and charts, sometimes technical writers must produce more complex and detailed graphs that require functions not available in these programs and may need to turn to graphing and diagramming tools (e.g., Microsoft Visio).
Screen capture tools. Technical writers frequently use screen-capture tools like Camtasia and Snagit. When creating instructions for computer software, it may be easier for a technical writer to simply record a short video of their desktops as they complete a task than it would be to write a lengthy series of instructions that describe how the task must be performed. Screen capture tools are also used to take screenshots of programs and software running on user's computers and then to create accompanying diagrams.

List of associations
Association for Business Communication
Czech Society for Technical Communication
European Association for Technical Communication
IEEE Professional Communication Society
Institute of Scientific and Technical Communicators
International Association of Business Communicators
SIGDOC
Society for Technical Communication

References

External links

Technical Writing Education Programs - Los Angeles Chapter, Society for Technical Communication (LASTC)
IEEE Transactions on Professional Communication
Technical writing courses from Wikiversity

Technical communication